Nikolaus “Nik” Welter (2 January 1871, Mersch – 13 July 1951, Luxembourg City) was a Luxembourgish writer, playwright, poet, professor, literary critic (Germanic and Romance languages), and statesman. He wrote predominantly in German. He also served as a Minister for Education in the government of Émile Reuter.

After his university studies in Leuven, Paris, Bonn and Berlin, he became a teacher in Diekirch (1897-1906) and later at the Athénée de Luxembourg in Luxembourg City (1906-1918).

Welter mainly wrote plays and poetry. His work Griselinde (1901) inspired the Luxembourgish composer Alfred Kowalsky to write the opera of the same name. Other well-known works are Die Söhne des Öslings, Goethes Husar, Der Abtrünnige, Professor Forster and Lene Frank.

From early on, Nik Welter was involved with the Félibrige, a poets' movement in the Provence, and was in contact with the members of the Felibertum félibrige: Frédéric Mistral, Joseph Roumanille and Théodore Aubanel. He was often at Mistral's house in Bouches-du-Rhône and was taken up into the circle of the Féliber. In the same way, he also met German Romanists such as Eduard Koschwitz and August Bertuch. Along with the two German Romanists, he campaigned successfully for Frédéric Mistral to be awarded the 1904 Nobel Prrize for Literature. 

Nik Welter recorded his travels in the Provence and in Tunisia in the book Hohe Sonnentage. In his book Im Werden und Wachsen, he wrote about his childhood in Mersch. He was the author of the first Luxembourgish schoolbook Das Luxemburgische und sein Schrifttum.

Life
Welter studied at the Universities of Leuven , Paris , Bonn and Berlin . He then went to the teaching profession and was teacher in Diekirch and later at the Athénée de Luxembourg .
During the reign Émile Reuters (Reuter government) Welter was 1918-1921 Minister of Education. He belonged to no party.
As author Welter wrote plays and poetry, as well as commissioned works such as 1909's "history of French literature" on behalf of the University of Marburg .

Work
Welter wrote almost exclusively in the German language. His drama "Griselinde" (1901) served the Luxembourg composer Alfred Kowalsky as libretto for his opera of the same name.
Around the turn of the century was Welters interest along with themes from the Luxembourg mythology and history, especially of the School of Félibrige reinvigorated literature in the minority in France "langue d'oc", the Provencal . He corresponded with famous German Romanist as Eduard Koschwitz and August Bertuch and traveled twice to Maillane ( Bouches-du-Rhône ) to Frédéric Mistral (Mistral Frederi), the "chef de file" of this movement. As one of the German Romanists, he was not indifferent to the efforts that the award of the 1904 Nobel Literature Prize led to Mistral. In reported Welter in his travelogue "Hohesonne days. A holiday book from Provence and Tunisia "(1912).

Honours
 1937: Joseph-von-Görres Prize
 1951: Grand Officer of the Order of the Oak Crown

Works

as an author
autobiographical
 In service. Memories of confused time . St. Paul's print shop, Luxembourg 1925th
 In the development and growth. Adventures of a boy . 4th ed Selbstverlag, Luxembourg 1962 (former title. In Will and waking from a childhood. ).
 Friendship and conduct. Memories . St. Paul's print shop, Luxembourg 1936th
poetry
Breakfast lights. Poems . AVG, Munich 1903rd
From old days. Poems .
In dust and gluten. New Poems . 2nd ed. Publisher for literature, art and music, Leipzig 1909th
Blast furnace. A book Psalms . Publisher Schroell, Luxembourg 1913th
About the fighting. Time Poems of neutrals . 6th ed. Worré-Mertens, Luxembourg 1915th
In the evening sun. Duet . Hansen VG, Saarlouis in 1935 (previous title: Marie Summer A book of songs. ).
non-fiction
The poets of the Luxembourg dialect. Literary conversations . 2nd ed. Publisher Schroell, Luxembourg 1906th
High solar days. A holiday book from Provence and Tunisia . Kösel Verlag, Munich 1909th
Jouse Roumanille. Lives and works . Diekirch 1898/99 [1] .
Frederi Mistral. The poet of Provence . Elwert Verlag, Marburg / Lahn 1899th
Theodore Aubanel. A Provencal singer of beauty . Elwert Verlag, Marburg / Lahn in 1902 [2] .
History of French literature . 3rd ed. Publisher Kösel & Pustet, Munich 1928th
The Luxembourg and his writings . Neuaufl. Soupert, Luxembourg 1938th
Dialect and High German seal in Luxembourg. A contribution to the intellectual and cultural history of the Grand Duchy . St. Paul's print shop, Luxembourg 1929th
theater
Siegfried and Melusina. Dramatized Volkssagein three divisions . Concordia DVA, Berlin 1900s.
The sons of the Oesling. A farmer drama from the time of the French Revolution in five acts . 4th ed. St. Paul's print shop, Luxembourg 1928th
The apostate. A comedy of fidelity . 2nd ed. Soupert, Luxembourg 1916th
Prof. Forster. A tragedy in five acts . Literature Institute Austria, Vienna 1908th
Eagle Aufflug. Drama . 1905 [3] .
Lene Frank. A teachers Drama (Lëtzeburer Library; Vol. 3). CELL, Luxembourg 1990 (Nachdr. D. Ed. Vienna 1906).
Mansfeld. A Game of Fate in four acts . Publisher Schroell, Diekirch 1912th
The worm. A Überrumpelungsspiel .
Dante's emperor. Historical character in five acts . Müller Verlag, Munich 1922nd
Griselinde. A drama in three acts and four pictures . Linden & Hansen Verlag, Luxembourg 1918 (music by Alfred Kowalsky ).
Grandmama. The tragedy of a soul; Drama in one act .
The bride or the maid of Grevenmacher. Drama .
Goethe Husar. From his "Poetry and Truth" in three acts . Linden & Hansen Verlag, Luxembourg 1932nd
Werkausgabe
Collected Works . Westermann Verlag, Braunschweig 1925/26 (5 volumes).

as editor
Franz Bergg (1866-1913). A proletarian life . New Frankfurter Verlag, Frankfurt / M. 1913th
Michel Rodange: The Grow Sigfrid scorching Goldkuommer. Komëdesteck a five acts . Linden & Hansen, Luxembourg 1929 (in addition to a liter arge prehistoric introduction by the editor).

External links 
 Nik Welter (in German)]

Luxembourgian writers
Independent politicians in Luxembourg
1871 births
1951 deaths
People from Mersch
Alumni of the Athénée de Luxembourg
German-language writers
Luxembourgian literary critics